Bald Hill Township is one of sixteen townships in Jefferson County, Illinois, USA.  As of the 2010 census, its population was 767 and it contained 359 housing units.

Geography
The township is centered at 38°10'N 89°6'W (38.169,-89.092).

Cities, towns, villages
 Waltonville (northeast quarter)

Unincorporated towns
 Emerson City at 
 Scheller at 
(This list is based on USGS data and may include former settlements.)

Adjacent townships
 Blissville Township (north)
 McClellan Township (northeast)
 Elk Prairie Township (east)
 Barren Township, Franklin County (southeast)
 Goode Township, Franklin County (south)
 DuBois Township, Washington County (northwest)

Cemeteries
The township contains these five cemeteries: Bald Hill, Dryden, Saint Barbara, Stephens and Ward.

Major highways
  Illinois Route 148

Demographics

School districts
 Sesser-Valier Community Unit School District 196
 Waltonville Community Unit School District 1

Political districts
 Illinois' 19th congressional district
 State House District 107
 State Senate District 54

References
 
 United States Census Bureau 2007 TIGER/Line Shapefiles
 United States National Atlas

External links
 City-Data.com
 Illinois State Archives

Townships in Jefferson County, Illinois
Mount Vernon, Illinois micropolitan area
Townships in Illinois